The Dana Library and Research Centre (formerly the Dana Centre) on Queen's Gate, South Kensington, London is part of the Science Museum Group. 

Designed by Sir Richard MacCormac of MJP Architects, the building opened in 2003 as a public event venue in London for contemporary science debate, run largely by the Science Museum. The building itself houses offices used by the Science Museum and the British Science Association (formerly known as British Association for the Advancement of Science). The Dana Centre is not directly accessible from the main museum, and is situated on the nearby Queen's Gate street.

Previously an events space and café, the building re-opened in late 2015 as the Dana Library and Research Centre, aiming to "provide a world-class environment for academic research, bringing together the museum’s thriving Research and Public History Department and access to its library and archive collections".

Opening times 
The centre is currently open to researchers and visitors alike by appointment only, Thursdays and Fridays from 11.00 to 17.00. It is closed on Bank Holidays during Christmas and New Years holiday periods.

Access to the collection 
Visitors to the Dana Centre can access almost 7,000 volumes on the history and biography of science, technology and medicine and their philosophical and social aspects. Journals are also available in physical and digital formats, with core titles being mainly available electronically.

As 99% of the Science Museum Group's library and archives are held at the Library and Archives at the National Collection Centre, in Whiltshire, some of the archival material will need to be ordered in advance.

References

External links
Official website of replacement Dana Research Centre 

Event venues established in 2003
Buildings and structures in the Royal Borough of Kensington and Chelsea
Science Museum, London
Museum education
Libraries in the Royal Borough of Kensington and Chelsea
Richard MacCormac buildings